The Symphony No. 7, Op. 344, is a work for orchestra by French composer Darius Milhaud. The piece was written in 1955 for a Radio Belge concert in Venice.

Milhaud's Seventh Symphony has three movements and a total running time of about 20 minutes. The titles of the movements, as descriptive of their character as of tempo, are as follows:
 Animé (approx. 3'40")
 Grave (approx. 9')
 Vif (approx. 7'15")

This symphony is published by Heugel & Cie.

Recordings 
 a 1993 all-digital recording by Alun Francis and the Radio-Sinfonieorchester Basel, part of a boxed set of Milhaud's Symphonies No. 1-12 on CPO
 a 1997 all-digital recording by Michel Plasson and the Toulouse Capitole Orchestra on Deutsche Grammophon

References 

Symphony 07
1955 compositions